Chalender or Challender was a populated place in Coconino County, Arizona, United States. It had a mainline railway station, sawmill, and school.
It was located on the Atlantic and Pacific Railroad between Williams and Bellemont.

References

Populated places in Coconino County, Arizona